Robert Davis Purvis (born 4 April 1948) is a retired Scottish footballer who played in the Scottish League for Queen's Park as a goalkeeper. He was capped by Scotland at amateur level.

References 

Scottish footballers
Scottish Football League players
Queen's Park F.C. players
Association football goalkeepers
Scotland amateur international footballers
Footballers from Dunfermline
1948 births
Edinburgh University A.F.C. players
Living people